Hurry Up and Wait is the third studio album by Australian rock band Dune Rats. It was released on 31 January 2020. The album was supported with an Australian tour between February and March 2020.

Lead singer Danny Beus said "We didn't set out to make a big album, or a polished album, or an album about partying because the last one did alright, or an album not about partying because we want to get away from that. It's just writing about different stuff in our lives. It was always just going to be Dunies."

Track listing

Charts

See also
List of 2020 albums

References

2020 albums
Dune Rats albums
Dine Alone Records albums
BMG Rights Management albums